Dipteromantispidae is an extinct family of neuropterans known from the Cretaceous period. Unlike other neuropterans, the family possesses only a single set of fully developed forewings, with the hindwings reduced to haltere like structures. They are generally small in size (forewing length 2.6-7.9 mm) and possess raptorial forelegs. They are considered to belong to Mantispoidea, with an uncertain position within the clade.

Taxonomy 
 †Burmodipteromantispa Liu et al. 2016
 †Burmodipteromantispa jiaxiaoae Liu et al. 2016 Burmese amber, Myanmar, Cenomanian
†Enigmadipteromantispa Azar et al. 2020
 †Enigmadipteromantispa dimyi  Azar et al. 2020 Burmese amber, Myanmar, Cenomanian
 †Dipteromantispa Makarkin et al. 2013
 †Dipteromantispa brevisubcosta Makarkin et al. 2013 Yixian Formation, China, Aptian
 †Halteriomantispa Liu et al. 2016
 †Halteriomantispa grimaldii Liu et al. 2016 Burmese amber, Myanmar, Cenomanian
 †Jersimantispa Liu et al. 2016
 †Jersimantispa henryi Grimaldi 2000 (Formerly Mantispidiptera henryi) New Jersey amber, Turonian
 †Kurtodipteromantispa Li & Liu, 2020 Burmese amber, Myanmar, Cenomanian
 †Kurtodipteromantispa xiai Li et al., 2020
 †Kurtodipteromantispa zhuodei Li & Liu, 2020
 †Mantispidiptera Grimaldi 2000
 †Mantispidiptera enigmatica Grimaldi 2000 New Jersey amber, Turonian
 †Mantispidipterella Liu et al. 2016
 †Mantispidipterella longissima Liu et al. 2016 Burmese amber, Myanmar, Cenomanian
 †Paradipteromantispa Li et al., 2020
 †Paradipteromantispa polyneura Li et al., 2020 Burmese amber, Myanmar, Cenomanian

References

Neuroptera families
Mantispoidea
Prehistoric insect families